Frank Booker may refer to:
 Frank Booker (basketball, born 1964), American basketball player
 Frank Aron Booker (born 1994), his son, American-Icelandic basketball player